Piz Vadret is a mountain of the Albula Alps, in Graubünden. With an altitude of 3,229 metres above sea level, Piz Vadret is the highest mountain of the Albula Alps north of Piz Kesch. At the base of the north face lies a glacier named Vadret da Grialetsch. The closest locality is Brail, in the Engadin.

References

External links
 Piz Vadret on Hikr

Mountains of the Alps
Alpine three-thousanders
Mountains of Switzerland
Mountains of Graubünden
Zernez